Mite Biting is claimed to be a natural defensive behavior of some honey bees to fight off the ectoparasitic mites Varroa destructor. This behavior has been studied since the late 1990s for honeybee breeding and improvement of honeybee stocks towards mite resistance. Krispn Given and Dr. Greg Hunt at Purdue University started a hierarchical selective breeding program in 1997–present for increased mite-biting/grooming behavior of European honey bee (Apis mellifera). A group of Midwest bee breeders visiting the Purdue bee lab were inspired to start the Heartland Honey Bee Breeders Cooperative as a result of their work.

Breeding program

Counting damaged mites is a method to measure the trait of mite biting behavior in honeybee colonies. Procedures for mite counts included 1) collecting mites, 2) placing mites on microscope slides, 3) counting number of mites, 4) observing mites for any damage under a microscope, and 5) summarizing the data for each colony.

References

Beekeeping